Sergey Zabavsky (born 15 January 1974) is a former Tajik long-distance runner who competed in the 2000 Summer Olympics in the marathon competition. He finished 68th with a time of 2:30:29.

She competed at six editions of the IAAF World Cross Country Championships from 1997 to 2002.

References

External links

Living people
1974 births
Tajikistani male long-distance runners
Tajikistani male marathon runners
Tajikistani male cross country runners
Olympic athletes of Tajikistan
Athletes (track and field) at the 2000 Summer Olympics
Asian Games competitors for Tajikistan
Athletes (track and field) at the 1998 Asian Games
Athletes (track and field) at the 2002 Asian Games
Tajikistani people of Russian descent